Angola have appeared in the finals of the FIFA World Cup on one occasion in 2006, since becoming a member of FIFA in 1980. They were eliminated in the Group Stage after a defeat by Portugal and two draws with Mexico and  Iran. In their last match, Flávio scored Angola's first and only goal of the tournament.

FIFA World Cup record

Angola at Germany 2006 

Group D of the 2006 FIFA World Cup

Angola vs Portugal

Mexico vs Angola

Iran vs Angola
Flávio got the opening goal of the game and Angola's only goal of the tournament when he headed home after a cross from the right in the 60th minute.

Record players

No less than eleven players have been fielded on all three occasions, making them record World Cup players for their country:

References

 
Countries at the FIFA World Cup
World Cup